A swivel lens is a lens that freely rotates while attached to a camera body. They are used on some compact digital and video cameras (camcorders). These lenses make it easy for a photographer to aim a camera without moving around too much. Swivel lenses come in different sizes and shapes. A swivel lens is also known as a swiveling lens, swivelling lens, and rotating lens.

In contrast, swivel LCDs (also known as articulating screen) are displays that freely rotate while attached to a camera body. Usually, the camera body is much larger than the swivelling display. Swivel LCD devices can be considered as swivel lens devices because the camera body can swivel around the small display; albeit, aiming the camera is more difficult. Most camcorders have a swivel LCD.

Uses
 Enables the user to take pictures from unique perspectives and camera angles 
 Easy composition of images without the need to bend, crouch, or move around
 Shooting self-portraits
 Shooting candid photos

List of cameras that have swivel lens
 Minolta DiMAGE V
 Nikon Coolpix 2500, 3500, 4500
 Nikon Coolpix S4, S10
 Nikon Coolpix 900, 950, 990, 995
 Sony DSC-U50 
 Sony DSC-F77, DSC-F77A, DSC-F88 
 Sony DSC-F505, DSC-F505V, DSC-F717, F828
 Sony Webbie HD MHS-PM1
 Sony Bloggie MHS-PM5 and MHS-PM5K
 Bushnell Nighthawk 260900 (night vision)
 Panasonic D-Snap SV-AS10, SV-AS30
 Casio QV-10, QV-11, QV-2900UX, EX-TR100
 Contax SL300RT*, U4R 
 Pentax Optio X
 Agfa ephoto 1280
 Kyocera SL300R, SL400R

List of other devices with swivel lens
 Sony Clie PDA (various PEG-XXXX models)
 Sony PlayStation Portable camera
 Game Boy Camera which swivels horizontally for self-portraits
 Veo SD camera for Toshiba e805 pocket pc 
 Notion Ink Adam
 Asus M50VM laptop computer

Cellphones 
 LG CU500
 LG VX7000
 Nokia N90
 Samsung V200, SCH-U740

Cellphones with pseudo swivel lens
Some cellphones have lens that rotate and allow users to take self-portraits but are limited in the angles where the camera can take pictures. 
 Samsung SPH-A900
 Samsung SGH-T809 (also known as Samsung D820)
 Samsung A930
 Nokia 3250

See also

Articulating screen

References

Photographic lenses